These Days (stylized as (these Days)) is the sixth studio album by American rock band Bon Jovi, released on June 27, 1995, by Mercury Records. This was the first album Bon Jovi released after the dismissal of original bass guitarist Alec John Such. It is also the first album to feature the bass guitar work of Hugh McDonald, who replaced Such as a session/touring member. The album, produced by Peter Collins, Jon Bon Jovi and Richie Sambora, is praised by many critics and fans as their best album. These Days is overall a darker album in contrast to the band's usual brand of feel-good, inspiring rock songs and love ballads.

At the time of release, the album was a huge commercial success, especially in the European and Asian markets. It became the band's fifth and fourth consecutive number one album in Australia and the United Kingdom. The album spawned four Top 10 singles on the UK Singles Chart, the band's highest number of Top 10 singles from one album in the UK. The high sales of the album in Europe warranted a re-issue of the album under the name of These Days Special Edition a year after its original release. The album was ranked number two on Q magazine's list of the "Top 50 albums of 1995". The album was also voted the album of the year in  British magazine Kerrang!'s readers poll in 1995. In 2006, the album featured in the Classic Rock & Metal Hammer's The "200 Greatest Albums of the 90s". In the U.S., despite selling 1 million copies and being certified platinum by the Recording Industry Association of America (RIAA), the album was not as successful as it was overseas and the album peaked at number nine on the Billboard 200.

Background 

When the Keep the Faith Tour ended in December 1993, Jon Bon Jovi went on a vacation in January 1994 where he wrote "Something to Believe In", the first song written for the album. Over the next nine months, Jon Bon Jovi and Richie Sambora wrote and demoed forty songs. The album was originally slated to be released in the fourth quarter of 1994, but they asked for more time to write additional material. Because of that, they released Cross Road, their first greatest hits album, with two new songs in October 1994.

Recording and production 

Jon Bon Jovi hired Peter Collins to produce the album, based on his prior work with several acts such as Rush, Queensrÿche and Alice Cooper. Jon Bon Jovi and Richie Sambora were co-producers of the album. They made a start recording the album in Nashville in the fall of 1994. After a week to ten days of recording, during October 1994, Jon Bon Jovi erased it all. Recording continued over the next four months and it shifted between Jon Bon Jovi's home studio Sanctuary I in Woodstock, NY, and three separate studios in Los Angeles: One On One Studios, Ocean Way Recording, and A&M Studios. There were various reasons why so many different studios were used.

One reason for studio changes, while recording in Woodstock, NY, was industrial metal band Fear Factory were recording their album Demanufacture in a neighboring studio.  Bon Jovi's engineers repeatedly complained about the volume Fear Factory were recording at as it was bleeding into their drum mics.

Regardless, all the basic tracks except for "Diamond Ring" and "(It's Hard) Letting You Go" were recorded in Woodstock, NY. All the rhythm guitar parts were recorded in Los Angeles and all the keyboards were recorded in New Jersey. Most vocals were done in New Jersey. Very little was done in Nashville: one vocal and one or two keyboard parts. "Diamond Ring" and "(It's Hard) Letting You Go" were recut in Los Angeles. The album was mixed by Bob Clearmountain in Los Angeles.

Then the band embarked on a mini Christmas tour of clubs in December 1994 and they continued to promote Cross Road and Richie Sambora's marriage to Heather Locklear.

Composition

Music 

Jon Bon Jovi is credited with composing the music for all of the album's tracks. Richie Sambora is also credited with composing the music for all of the album's tracks, except "(It's Hard) Letting You Go" and "Something To Believe In"; both were written and composed by Jon Bon Jovi. He is also not credited on "Hearts Breaking Even", which was written and composed  by Jon Bon Jovi and Desmond Child. Desmond is also credited with composing "Something For The Pain", "This Ain't A Love Song" and "Diamond Ring". All of the other tracks were written by Jon Bon Jovi and Richie Sambora. According to Jon Bon Jovi, the album was influenced by alternative rock and metal bands such as Pearl Jam, Tool, and Nine Inch Nails.

Lyrics 

Jon Bon Jovi stated that even though the album was their darkest, the band was in a very happy place at the time. "Hey God" was written by Jon Bon Jovi and Richie Sambora in Jon Bon Jovi's basement. Jon Bon Jovi was inspired by the view out of the window from 57th St. and Broadway in New York, a guy with an Armani suit on next to a guys that's sleeping on the street. "Something For The Pain" was the most difficult to write, says Jon Bon Jovi. They kept rewriting until the chorus made sense. "My Guitar Lies Bleeding In My Arms" was written from a writing session where they were hit with writer's block. Taking a cue from the opening line of "Bed of Roses" ("Sitting here wasted and wounded at this old piano, Trying hard to capture the moment"), Jon Bon Jovi instead of putting the pen down, wrote about his experience. "Damned" is about a guy who is involved with a married woman. "(It's Hard) Letting You Go" was written by Jon Bon Jovi for the movie called Moonlight and Valentino in which he appeared. "Something To Believe In" is an introspective song about a man questioning everything around him. Richie Sambora's "Hey, hey, hey" chant on the song is lifted from the demo. It was spot-on they kept it and used it on the album. "Diamond Ring" was originally written for the album New Jersey in 1988 and was played live six times during the New Jersey Syndicate Tour, but never made it onto any previous Bon Jovi album.

Release and reception 

Two titles that were considered were "Open All Night" and "Strip" but ultimately, the band wanted to make a statement about the themes of the record. Mark Selliger shot the album cover in Mexico.

The two extra songs "All I Want Is Everything" and "Bitter Wine" appear as bonus tracks on the international versions. Released June 12 in Japan, June 19 in Europe and June 27 in the rest of the world, the album was an immediate success. It even replaced Michael Jackson's HIStory in the UK, debuting at number one, spending four weeks at number one. These Days also topped the charts in several other European countries, including Germany, Austria, Switzerland, the Netherlands, Ireland, Finland, and Portugal and spending seven weeks on Billboard European Albums Chart. It was certified triple platinum by the International Federation of the Phonographic Industry for selling 3 million copies across Europe.

In Australia, it debuted at number one and spent two weeks at number one on the ARIA Charts. The album became Bon Jovi's second number one album in Japan, where it debuted at number one on the Oricon chart, selling over 379,000, becoming the fastest selling album by a non-Japanese act in history of the country's chart. The album has sold more than 1 million copies and certified five times platinum and became the band's best selling studio album in Japan.

These Days received favorable reviews from critics. Q magazine, in a perfect score, said that "Cross Road" and "Always" confirmed that Bon Jovi would survive grunge and These Days consolidated their status by keeping Michael Jackson's HIStory album off the UK number 1 album slot. The review said that "Hey God", "Lie to Me" and "Something to Believe In" were singled out as the album's highlights and the album was arguably the band's finest musical hour to date. Stephen Thomas Erlewine of AllMusic concluded that "as the years go by, Bon Jovi gets musically stronger. Not only are their best songs stronger now, their playing is more accomplished. Keeping these improvements in mind, it's no surprise that the group was one of the few pop-metal bands to sustain a career in the mid-'90s". The album was ranked number two on Q magazine's list of the "Top 50 albums of 1995", beat out  by The Great Escape of the British band Blur. The album was mentioned as the second best album of 1995, after (What's The Story) Morning Glory? by Oasis according to some critics.

In the United Kingdom, the album was particularly notable for producing four Top 10 hit singles, and the UK Rock & Metal had 4 singles in the #1 top singles with This Ain't A Love Song, Something For The Pain, These Days and Hey God but failed to impress the audience and the critics in the United States. The album peaked at number nine on the Billboard 200. Entertainment Weekly said "the group happily forsakes conventional corporate rock for a loud kind of adult pop. Think Whitney Houston with guitars".

Track listing

Personnel 
Sourced from AllMusic.
Bon Jovi
Jon Bon Jovi – vocals, percussion, harmonica, producer
Richie Sambora – acoustic & electric guitar, electric sitar, background vocals, producer, co-lead vocals on "Something For The Pain"
David Bryan – keyboards, background vocals
Tico Torres – drums, percussion

Additional musicians
Hugh McDonald – bass
David Campbell – string arrangements
Richie LaBamba – trombone
Jerry Vivino – tenor saxophone
Mark Pender – trumpet
Ed Manion – baritone saxophone
Tommy Funderburk, Rory Dodd – additional background vocals
Suzie Katayama – accordion
Randy Jackson – additional bass
Jerry Cohen – additional keyboards
Robbie Buchanan – keyboards, programming

Production staff
 Peter Collins – producer
 Nathaniel Kunkel, Jay Schwartz, David Thoener, Gabe Veltry – engineer
 Mark Apringer, Ryan Freeland, Jim Labinski, Chris Laidlaw, Manny Lecouna, Pete Martinez, Mark Mason, Tal Miller, Mike Scotella, Mark Springer – assistant engineer
 Margery Greenspan – art direction, artwork
 Frank Harkins – design
Cynthia Levine – photography
George Marino – mastering, remastering
Mark Selinger – photography

Charts

Weekly charts

Year-end charts

Certifications

References 

Bon Jovi albums
1995 albums
Albums produced by Peter Collins (record producer)
Albums produced by Richie Sambora
Mercury Records albums